The 1998–99 season of the Jupiler League was held between August 21, 1998, and May 16, 1999.  Racing Genk became champions.

Promoted teams

These teams were promoted from the second division at the start of the season:
Oostende (second division champions)
Kortrijk (playoff winner)

Relegated teams
These teams were relegated to the second division at the end of the season:
Kortrijk
Oostende

Genk's title success
After a deceiving start of the competition Anderlecht managed to come back at the top of the ranking under the management of Jean Dockx and Franky Vercauteren even beating its long-time rival Standard Liège in a memorable 0-6 demonstration.  Two matches before the end of the season, the ranking was as such:

Those three teams were thus still able to win the championship.  While Club Brugge lost its game to Mouscron 2-0, Anderlecht secured a 2-5 win to Genk.  However the Racing did win its last match at Harelbeke and it thus became champion.

Battle for Europe
With Genk qualifying for the UEFA Champions League, Anderlecht and Brugge entered the UEFA Cup.

The relegation dog fight
Lommel avoided relegation by winning its last match 2-1 to Charleroi while the newcomer Kortrijk lost to Anderlecht.  The other newcomer (Oostende) was already relegated at this moment.

Final league table

Results

Top scorers

See also
1998–99 in Belgian football

References
 Sport.be website – Archive

Belgian Pro League seasons
Belgian
1998–99 in Belgian football